FC Gazy Auburn, is an Australian amateur (formerly semi-professional until 2019) soccer club, based and located in the Auburn area of New South Wales. In season 2019, they competed in the NSW State League competition.

History  
Formed by the Bosnian community of Western Sydney in 2002 as Gazy Lansvale the club entered the then NSW State League 2 competition in 2015 as FC Gazy Lansvale. In their first season, the club picked up only 3 wins and finished 8th out of the 10 teams.

In 2016 the club finished last in the rebranded NSW State League competition with only 3 wins.

The club is a seniors-only side (18s, 20s and 1st grade).

Club colours 
The club colours are blue and white.

See also
FC Bossy Liverpool

Notes and references

External links 
  NSW State League Competition Website
 Official Website

Soccer clubs in Sydney
Diaspora sports clubs in Australia
European-Australian culture
Auburn, New South Wales